The 2013–14 Vijay Hazare Trophy was the 12th season of the Vijay Hazare Trophy, a List A cricket tournament in India. It took place in February and March 2014. In the final, Karnataka beat Railways by four wickets to win their first title.

Group stage

Central Zone

East Zone

North Zone

South Zone

West Zone

Final

References

External links
 Series home at ESPN Cricinfo

Vijay Hazare Trophy
Vijay Hazare Trophy